This is a non-exhaustive list of Arduino boards and compatible systems. It lists boards in these categories:
 Released under the official Arduino name
 Arduino "shield" compatible
 Development-environment compatible
 Based on non-Atmel processors

Where different from the Arduino base feature set, compatibility, features, and licensing details are included.

Official 
Many versions of the official Arduino hardware have been commercially produced to date:

See also list of Official Arduino Boards in wikidata

Superseded 
The following have been superseded by later and more capable versions from Arduino.

Compatible 
Although the hardware and software designs are freely available under copyleft licenses, the developers have requested that the name "Arduino" be exclusive to the official product and not be used for derivative works without permission. The official policy document on the use of the Arduino name emphasizes that the project is open to incorporating work by others into the official product.

As a result of the protected naming conventions of the Arduino, a group of Arduino users forked the Arduino Diecimila, releasing an equivalent board called Freeduino. The name "Freeduino" is not trademarked and is free to use for any purpose.

Several Arduino-compatible products commercially released have avoided the "Arduino" name by using "-duino" name variants.

Footprint-compatible 
The following boards are fully or almost fully compatible with both the Arduino hardware and software, including being able to accept "shield" daughterboards.

Special purpose compatible 
Special purpose Arduino-compatible boards add additional hardware optimised for a specific application. It is kind of like having an Arduino and a shield on a single board. Some are Shield compatible, others are not.

Industrial grade

Software-compatibility only 
These boards are compatible with the Arduino software, but they do not accept standard shields. They have different connectors for power and I/O, such as a series of pins on the underside of the board for use with breadboards for prototyping, or more specific connectors. One of the important choices made by Arduino-compatible board designers is whether or not to include USB circuitry in the board. For many Arduino tasks, the USB circuitry is redundant once the device has been programmed, so that circuitry can be placed in the cable between development PC and board, thus making each instance of the board less expensive, potentially smaller, and more power efficient.

Non-ATmega 
The following non-ATmega boards accept Arduino shield daughter boards. The microcontrollers are not compatible with the official Arduino IDE, but they do provide a version of the Arduino IDE and compatible software libraries.

Non-Arduino 
The following boards accept Arduino shield daughter boards. They do not use microcontrollers compatible with the Arduino IDE, nor do they provide an alternative implementation of the Arduino IDE and software libraries.

References

Further reading

External links 
 

Arduino